French Black people or Black people in France (French: Noirs de France) or Afro-French (Afro-Français) are French citizens or residents who are of Sub-Saharan African (including Malagasy people) or Melanesian ancestry. It also includes people of mixed African/Melanesian and French ancestry.

Population statistics
Although it is illegal for the French state to collect data on ethnicity and race in the census (a law with its origins in the 1789 revolution and reaffirmed in the constitution of 1958), various population estimates exist. An article in The New York Times in 2008 stated that estimates vary between 3 million and 5 million. It is estimated that four out of five black people in France are of African immigrant origin, with the minority being chiefly of Caribbean ancestry.

Some organizations, such as the Representative Council of France's Black Associations (CRAN), have argued in favor of the introduction of data collection on minority groups but this has been resisted by other organizations and ruling politicians, often on the grounds that collecting such statistics goes against France's secular principles and harks back to Vichy-era identity documents. During the 2007 presidential election, however, Nicolas Sarkozy was polled on the issue and stated that he favoured the collection of data on ethnicity. Part of a parliamentary bill which would have permitted the collection of data for the purpose of measuring discrimination was rejected by the Conseil Constitutionnel in November 2007.

Notable people

In French politics

Afro-French or Kanak members of the French Parliament or government from overseas France 
There have been dozens of Afro-Caribbean, Kanak, and Afro-French MPs representing overseas electoral districts at the French National Assembly or at the French Senate, and several government members.

 Roger Bambuck, Minister of Youth and Sports from 1988 to 1991.
 Aimé Césaire, mayor of Fort-de-France and deputy from Martinique for the PCF/Martinican Progressive Party.
 Jean-Louis d'Anglebermes, Kanak politician from Caledonian Union.
 Félix Éboué, French Guianan-born colonial administrator and Free French leader.
 Laura Flessel-Colovic, she became the Sport Minister in 2017.
 Serge Letchimy, deputy for Martinique Socialist Party, Letchimy is also of partial Tamil descent.
 Gaston Monnerville, politician and lawyer, he was the president of the Senate from 1958 to 1968.
 Maurice Ponga, New Caledonian politician who served as Member of the European Parliament (MEP) for the Overseas constituency from 2009 to 2019.
 Christiane Taubira, deputy from French Guiana, was the first black candidate to a French presidential election, in 2002. In 2012, she became the Justice Minister until 2016.
 Manuéla Kéclard-Mondésir, deputy from Martinique

Afro-French people elected in metropolitan France 
 Severiano de Heredia, president of the municipal council of Paris (1879–1880/ sort of mayor of Paris ), deputy for Paris (1881–1889), minister (1887)
 Blaise Diagne (1872-1934), first person of Sub-Saharan African origin elected to the French Chamber of Deputies, and the first to hold a position in the French government.
 Élie Bloncourt (1896–1978), second Black metropolitan deputy (1936–40, 1945–47), first Black metropolitan general councillor (1934–40, 1945–51)
 Ernest Chénière (1945–), former deputy for Oise (1993–97)
 Raphaël Élizé (fr) (1891–1945), first Black metropolitan mayor (1929–40)
 Hélène Geoffroy, deputy for Rhône, mayor
Maxette Grisoni-Pirbakas, elected an MEP in 2019.
Gaston Monnerville (1897–1991), first Black metropolitan senator (1946–1974), president of the French Senate (1947–68), mayor, president of Lot's general council
 George Pau-Langevin, Paris deputy (2007–12), junior minister (2012–2014), Minister for Overseas (2014–)
 Arthur Richards (1890–1972), general councillor in Bordeaux (1951–1964), deputy for Gironde (1958–67)
 Rama Yade, former minister and secretary of State
 Harlem Désir, former minister for European Affairs and MEP, former First Secretary of the French Socialist Party
 Kofi Yamgnane, former minister, former MP, former mayor, former general councillor in Brittany.
 Hervé Berville, Rwandan genocide survivor, French economist and politician, Côtes-d'Armor MP for La République En Marche! since June 2017, party spokesperson.
 Seybah Dagoma, then 34-year-old lawyer of Chadian descent and founding member of a left-wing think tank, was elected in a Parisian constituency in 2012 and in office until 2017.
 Laetitia Avia, lawyer of Togolese descent, member of the National Assembly for the Paris's 6th constituency elected in 2017, defeated in 2022
 Danièle Obono, Gabonese descent MP for La France Insoumise representing the 17th Paris constituency since the legislative elections of 2017.
 Nadège Abomangoli, deputy from Seine-Saint-Denis

Political activists 
 Frantz Fanon, Marxist, existentialist and anti-colonial author and activist. Renounced his French citizenship.
Kémi Séba, Pan-Africanist political leader, writer, activist and geopolitical analyst for various African television channels
 Louis-Georges Tin, president of the Representative Council of France's Black Associations and founder of the International Day Against Homophobia
 Rokhaya Diallo, French journalist, BET-France host, author, filmmaker, and activist for racial, gender and religious equality.
 Sibeth Ndiaye, French-Senegalese communications advisor. Government Spokeswoman for Edouard Philippe's government from April 2019 to July 2020.
 Susanna Ounei, Kanak independence activist.

In sports

In basketball

In football

In rugby

Other sports 
 Christine Arron, track and field sprint athlete
 Surya Bonaly, Olympic figure skater
 Stéphen Boyer, volleyball player
 Laura Flessel-Colovic, fencer
 Vanessa James, Olympic figure skater
 Gaël Monfils, tennis player
 Daniel Narcisse, team handball player, IHF World Player of the Year 2012
 Francis Ngannou, mixed martial artist
 Earvin N'Gapeth, volleyball player
 Barthélémy Chinenyeze, volleyball player
 Éric N'Gapeth, father of Earvin, volleyball player
 Yannick Noah, last French French Open tennis winner to this day (1983), current French Davis Cup coach
 Marie-José Pérec, multiple Olympic gold medal sprinter
 Jackson Richardson, team handball player, IHF World Player of the Year 1995
 Teddy Riner, judoka
 Jo-Wilfried Tsonga, tennis player

In entertainment and media 

 Josephine Baker, dancer and singer
 Guillaume Guillon-Lethière, painter
 Fatou Diome, best-selling and award-winning author of Senegalese origin.
 Élé Asu, journalist and TV presenter of Nigerian descent
 Édouard Montoute, French actor and thespian
 Dominique Thimbakala, TV newscaster for BFM TV
 Kareen Guiock, TV newscaster for M6
 Mouss Diouf, actor
 Ladj Ly, film director and screenwriter
 Aya Nakamura, singer
 Miss Dominique, singer
 Fabe, rapper
 Hélène and Célia Faussart (Les Nubians), singing duo
 Aissa Maiga, actress
 Sonia Rolland, actress
 Imany, singer
 Hubert Kounde, actor and thespian
 Lord Kossity, Dancehall musician
 Dieudonné M'bala M'bala, comedian and anti-Zionist activist
 Fab Morvan, model and singer, half of Milli Vanilli
 Audrey Pulvar, newscaster and journalist
 Firmine Richard, actress
 Harry Roselmack, newscaster
 Omar Sy, César-winning actor
 Olivier Coipel, comic book artist
 Bukola Elemide, Female musician
 Black M, rapper
 MHD, rapper
 MC Solaar, cult French rapper
 Niska, rapper 
 Dadju, singer
 Shy'm, pop singer
 Les Twins, new-style hip-hop dancers
 Ziak (fr), rapper
 Jacky Brown and Ben-J (Nèg' Marrons (fr)), reggae & hip-hop duo

In literature 
 Calixthe Beyala, writer
 Aimé Césaire, writer
 Suzanne Césaire, writer
 Maryse Condé, writer
 Léon Damas, writer
 Edouard Glissant, writer
 Marie NDiaye, writer
 Daniel Picouly, author

European / African (or Afro-Caribbean) descent 
 Alexandre Dumas, writer
 Alexandre Dumas fils, writer
 Thomas-Alexandre Dumas, general in the French Revolution and father of Alexandre Dumas
 Thierry Dusautoir, rugby player
 Chevalier de Saint-Georges, composer, conductor, and violinist, master fencer and military man
 Rudy Gobert, basketball player
 Noémie Lenoir, model
 Chevalier de Meude-Monpas, French musician and composer
 Chloé Mortaud, Miss France 2009
 Anais Mali, model
 Sonia Rolland, actress, Miss France 2000
 Jo-Wilfried Tsonga, tennis player
 Gaël Monfils, tennis player
 Flora Coquerel, Miss France 2014
 Alicia Aylies, Miss France 2017
 Willy William, singer and producer
 Cindy Bruna, model
 Ciryl Gane, mixed martial artist

See also

 Zaire
 Belgium
 Switzerland
 African Americans in France
 Haitians in France

References

African diaspora in France
African diaspora in Europe
Caribbean French
France
Ethnic groups in France
Kanak people